Syðrugøta is a village on the east coast of the Faroese island of Eysturoy in Eystur Municipality.

The December 2022 population was 491. Its postal code is FO 513.

The famous Faroese singer Eivør Pálsdóttir was born here in 1983. Also Tróndur í Gøtu, the most famous Faroe Islander of the Viking age in Faroese history, is said to have lived in the village. Many stories and facts back up that claim.

Several excavations have shown that Syðrugøta is one of the oldest settlements in the Faroe Islands. During many excavations up to the latest one in 2006, remains from the first settlements have been found. Many believe that the great Norse chieftain, Tróndur í Gøtu lived and had his chiefdom in Syðrugøtu – among many reasons why, is because of the good view he would have had out to the horizon and the short distance to his fleet, stationed at Undir Gøtueiði.
There are still many unexcavated ruins of centuries-old farmhouses buried in the ground in Syðrugøtu.

Varðin í Gøtu 
One of the most influential and wealthy companies in the Faroe Islands, Varðin í Gøtu, is based in Syðrugøta. Varðin í Gøtu owns several large fishing vessels, trawlers, like Tróndur í Gøtu, Finnur Fríði, Jupiter, and Saksaberg. The trawlers fish mackerel, herring, capelin and blue whiting. Varðin í Gøtu is the parent company for these limited companies: Driftin, Desin, Hvanngarður, Krossbrekka, Hvamm, Gulenni which owns fishing vessels, Varðin Pelagic which is a pelagic-fish factory, and Uppisjóvarhavnin which is the harbour in Tvøroyri where Varðin Pelagic was built in 2012. The CEO of Varðin í Gøtu is Jákup Jacobsen, also known as Dunga Jákup. His son Bogi Jacobsen is the CEO of Varðin Pelagic and board member of all of Varðin's subsidiary companies. Around 350 people work for the companies of Varðin í Gøtu.

Music 
G! Festival is an annual Faroese festival that is held in Syðrugøta, and it's one of the largest festivals in the Faroe Islands. The village also saw the birth of Eivør Pálsdóttir, one of the best known singers from the archipelago worldwide.

Gallery

See also
List of towns in the Faroe Islands

References

Populated places in the Faroe Islands